Carlos Orejuela may refer to:

 Carlos Orejuela (footballer, born 1980), Peruvian footballer striker
 Carlos Orejuela (footballer, born 1993), Ecuadorian football striker